João Carlos Araújo Matias (born 26 May 1991) is a Portuguese track and road cyclist, who currently rides for UCI Continental team . Representing Portugal at international competitions, Matias competed at the 2016 UEC European Track Championships in the Madison, the 1 km time trial and the elimination race events. He has also competed in five editions of the UCI Track Cycling World Championships.

Major results

Road
2013
 5th Road race, National Under-23 Championships
2018
 Grande Prémio de Portugal Nacional 2
1st Points classification
1st Stage 5
2019
 1st Stage 1 Grande Prémio Jornal de Notícias
2022
 1st  Mountains classification, Volta ao Algarve
 1st Stages 2 & 4 Volta a Portugal
 5th Road race, National Championships

Track

2017
 1st  Scratch, National Championships
2018
 1st  Individual pursuit, National Championships
2019
 1st  Madison (with Rui Oliveira), National Championships
2020
 National Championships
1st  Points race
1st  Individual pursuit
2021
 2nd  Elimination, UEC European Championships
2022
 National Championships
1st  Omnium
1st  Madison (with Iúri Leitão)

References

External links

1991 births
Living people
Portuguese male cyclists
Portuguese track cyclists
People from Barcelos, Portugal
Cyclists at the 2019 European Games
European Games competitors for Portugal